Antonio Ordeñana Rodríguez [Or-deh-nyahna] (October 30, 1918 – September 29, 1988), nicknamed "Mosquito", was a Major League Baseball shortstop who appeared in one game for the Pittsburgh Pirates in 1943.  The 5'9", 158 lb. rookie was a native of Guanabacoa, Cuba. He was born on October 30, 1918 in Guanabacoa, Havana, Cuba.

Ordeñana is one of many ballplayers who only appeared in the major leagues during World War II.  His major league debut was on October 3, 1943, and he was in the starting lineup at home against the Philadelphia Phillies for the last game of the season.  The Pirates lost the game 11–3, but Ordeñana went 2-for-4 and drove in all three runs against starter and winner Roger McKee.  Ordeñana truly was a "one-game wonder"...excellent in the field as well as with the bat.  He recorded two putouts, five assists, no errors, and participated in one double play.

Ordeñana died at the age of 69 in Miami, Florida.

External links 

Retrosheet

Major League Baseball shortstops
Major League Baseball players from Cuba
Cuban expatriate baseball players in the United States
Pittsburgh Pirates players
Concord Nationals players
1918 births
1988 deaths
Morristown Red Sox players
Baseball players from Havana